Thorncrag Nature Sanctuary is a 450 acre forested wildlife preserve owned and managed by the Stanton Bird Club in Lewiston, Maine since 1921. At 510 feet high Thorncrag hill is highest point in Lewiston and contains many hiking trails.

History
In the nineteenth century the area was owned by the Thorne family and was the site of the homestead of Elder Benjamin Thorne (1779-1864), a Freewill Baptist preacher who dedicated Hathorn Hall at nearby Bates College. During this time it was known as the “Crag.” In 1921 the Stanton Bird Club, which was founded in 1919 in honor of Bates Professor Jonathan Stanton, received the land comprising the Sanctuary and founded the Thorncrag Nature Sanctuary with donations from another Bates professor, Alfred Williams Anthony. The name "Thorncrag" was created by Professor Anthony. Bates College has used the land for scientific research and in the past it was also used as a dairy and sheep farm, a Highland Spring bottling facility, a tuberculosis sanitorium. Today Thorncrag Nature Sanctuary is used for various educational and recreational purposes including hiking and birdwatching.

References

External links
Official website

1921 establishments in Rhode Island
Bird observatories in the United States
Bird sanctuaries of the United States
Education in Androscoggin County, Maine
Lewiston, Maine
Nature conservation organizations based in the United States
Non-profit organizations based in Maine
Ornithological organizations in the United States
Protected areas established in 1921
Protected areas of Androscoggin County, Maine